F. Stuart Chapin III (or Terry Chapin) (born February 2, 1944) is a professor of Ecology at the Department of Biology and Wildlife of the Institute of Arctic Biology, University of Alaska. He was President of the Ecological Society of America (ESA) from August 2010 until 2011.

The grandson of sociologist F. Stuart Chapin, Chapin III is better known to students and colleagues as 'Terry'. Chapin also serves as principal investigator of the Bonanza Creek Long-Term Ecological Research (LTER) program, and has a background in plant physiological ecology and ecosystem ecology. His current research interests focus on the resilience of social-ecological systems. As director of the graduate educational program in Resilience and Adaptation at the University of Alaska, Fairbanks, Chapin studies human-fire interactions in the boreal forest. As President of ESA, he plans to address the "critical issue" of planetary stewardship. With Mary Power and Steward Pickett, Chapin is leading a Planetary Stewardship initiative “whose goal is to reorient society toward a more sustainable relationship with the biosphere.”

In 2019 Terry Chapin won the Volvo Environment Prize. The jury citation states: "Professor Terry Chapin is not only a world-leading ecologist, he is also one of the world’s most profound thinkers and actors on stewardship of the Earth System. [...] His work will have a long-lasting impact on the ways we seek to build a sustainable future, with the concept of Earth Stewardship supporting the deep institutional and structural change required to meet the challenges ahead."

Academic career

Awards, grants, and honors
 Guggenheim Fellowship, 1979–1980
 Kempe Award for Distinguished Ecologists, 1996
 Hill Professor, 1995 (Univ. of Minnesota)
 Member Ecology Institute (Germany) 1986-
 Usibelli Award (top researcher in all fields; Univ. of Alaska) 2000
 Fellow of the American Association for the Advancement of Science 2000
 Member Royal Swedish Academy of Agriculture and Forestry 2000
 Outstanding faculty member, University of Alaska (selected by students) 2002
 Fellow of  American Academy of Arts and Sciences 2002
 Member National Academy of Sciences 2004
 Oosting lecture, Duke University 2004. US Forest Service Wilderness Research Award on behalf of the Resilience and Adaptation Program.
 Sustainability Science Award, 2008 (F. Stuart Chapin, III and Colleagues). Ecological Society of America
 Volvo Environment Prize 2019

Notable publications

References

Further reading

External links 
 Personal website

University of Alaska Fairbanks faculty
Stanford University alumni
Members of the Royal Swedish Academy of Agriculture and Forestry
Living people
Fellows of the American Academy of Arts and Sciences
Members of the United States National Academy of Sciences
1944 births
Fellows of the Ecological Society of America